Lucifer: Book of Angels Volume 10 is an album by the Bar Kokhba Sextet performing compositions from John Zorn's second Masada book, "The Book of Angels".

Reception
The Allmusic review by Sean Westergaard awarded the album 4½ stars stating "Honestly, with this material and these players, you just can't go wrong. There are highlights aplenty, starting with Ribot and Baptista on the opening track. Friedlander and Feldman shine on both "Dalquiel" and "Quelamia." Joey Baron tears it up on "Gediel" and does some great brushwork on "Azbugah." The playing all the way around is just fantastic. You could even play this album for your grandmother, something you can't say about much of the rest of the Zorn catalog. Whether you like all his projects or not, John Zorn's output has been of a consistently high quality. Lucifer: Book of Angels, Vol. 10 is among the finest offerings in his discography, and a very accessible one at that".

Track listing

 Sother - 5:58
 Dalqiel - 6:07 - misspelled as "Dalquiel" on album sleeve 
 Zazel - 3:22
 Gediel - 6:12
 Rahal - 3:49
 Zechriel - 7:54
 Azbugah - 3:02
 Mehalalel - 9:53
 Quelamia - 4:59
 Abdiel - 3:24

All compositions by John Zorn.

Personnel

Cyro Baptista – percussion 
Joey Baron – drums 
Greg Cohen – bass 
Mark Feldman – violin 
Erik Friedlander – cello 
Marc Ribot – guitar

References 

2008 albums
Book of Angels albums
Albums produced by John Zorn
Tzadik Records albums
Bar Kokhba albums